Gopal Lal Sharma is a member of the Rajasthan Legislative Assembly representing Mandalgarh (Rajasthan Assembly constituency) from 2018. He defeated Vivek Dhakar by 10,333 votes. He has also assumed the charge of Bhilwara UIT Chairman.

References

Bharatiya Janata Party politicians from Rajasthan
Rajasthan MLAs 2018–2023
Year of birth missing (living people)
Living people